Valle de Zaragoza  is one of the 67 municipalities of Chihuahua, in northern Mexico. The municipal seat lies at Valle de Zaragoza. 

As of 2010, the municipality had a total population of 5,105, up from 4,341 as of 2005.

Geography
As of 2010, the town of Valle de Zaragoza had a population of 2,223. Other than the town of Valle de Zaragoza, the municipality had 156 localities, none of which had a population over 1,000.

References

Municipalities of Chihuahua (state)